The 2018 Drake Bulldogs football team represented Drake University as a member of the Pioneer Football League (PFL) during 2018 NCAA Division I FCS football season. Led by fifth-year head coach Rick Fox, the Bulldogs compiled an overall record of 7–4 with a mark of 6–2 in conference play, tying for second place in the PFL. The team played its home games at Drake Stadium in Des Moines, Iowa.

On December 10, Fox resigned. He finished his five-year tenure at Drake with a record of 33–22.

Previous season
The Bulldogs finished the 2017 season 7–4, 6–2 in PFL play to finish in second place.

Preseason

Preseason All-PFL team
The PFL released their preseason all-PFL team on July 30, 2018, with the Bulldogs having four players selected.

Offense

Steven Doran – WR

Jordan Lewinsky – OL

Defense

Nathan Clayberg – DL

Sean Lynch – DB

Preseason coaches poll
The PFL released their preseason coaches poll on July 31, 2018, with the Bulldogs predicted to finish in third place.

Schedule

Game summaries

at Montana

Missouri S&T

at Jacksonville

Butler

Stetson

at Dayton

at Valparaiso

San Diego

Marist

at Morehead State

at Iowa State

References

Drake
Drake Bulldogs football seasons
Drake Bulldogs football